The 1993–94 Ronchetti Cup was the 23rd edition of FIBA's second-tier competition for European women's basketball clubs. It was contested by 67 teams, ten more than the previous season, and ran from 8 September 1993 to 16 March 1994. Ahena Cesena won the competition for the first and sole time, defeating defending champion Lavezzini Parma in the third all-Italian final in your years. It was the last of five editions in a row won by Italian teams.

First qualifying round

Second qualifying round

Third Qualifying Stage

Group stage

Group A

Group B

Group C

Group D

Quarterfinals

Semifinals

Final

References

1993-94
1993–94 in European women's basketball